Tony Rosetti (born December 11, 1945) is an American former sports shooter. He competed in the skeet event at the 1972 Summer Olympics.

References

1945 births
Living people
American male sport shooters
Olympic shooters of the United States
Shooters at the 1972 Summer Olympics
Sportspeople from Biloxi, Mississippi
Pan American Games medalists in shooting
Pan American Games gold medalists for the United States
Pan American Games silver medalists for the United States
Shooters at the 1971 Pan American Games